Urassaya Sperbund is a Thai actress and model who has received various awards and nominations, including five Kom Chad Luek Awards, six Siamdara Star Awards, and a Suphannahong National Film Awards. Additionally, she has been nominated for five Nataraja Awards and a Bangkok Critics Assembly Awards.

Awards and nominations

Notes

References

External links
 

Lists of awards received by Thailand actor